Joel Andrew Tomkins (born 21 March 1987) is a former English professional rugby league footballer who last played  forward for the Catalans Dragons in the Betfred Super League, and has played for England at international level.

He has previously played for the Wigan Warriors and Hull Kingston Rovers in the Super League. He also played professional rugby union for Saracens in the English Rugby Premiership and the England Saxons and England at international level.

Background
Tomkins was born in Warrington, Cheshire, England, but he was raised in Wigan, Greater Manchester, England.

He is the eldest brother of Sam Tomkins and Logan Tomkins, who also both played rugby league.

Rugby league career

Early career
Tomkins is a former St. John Fisher player, where he played in the Wigan Warriors' Academy at under-18's level in 2003. He was selected for the 2004 Academy Origin Series. Joel was one of the most highly rated talents in the Wigan Warriors' Academy.

Wigan Warriors (2005–11)
In 2005, he was called up into the first-team at the age of 18 and he made his senior début for the Wigan Warriors against the Widnes Vikings in March 2005. During 2005, Joel made another 12 appearances and scoring a total of 3 tries in the process. The talented youngster was given his chance at first-team level under coach Ian Millward, who had become Head Coach of the Wigan Warriors in 2005.

He was demoted to the bench for the second match of the season against the Leeds Rhinos. After 17-minutes he was brought from off the bench and scored a try with his first touch of the ball to give the Wigan Warriors a 4–0 lead. The Wigan Warriors went onto lose the match, 16–24. In February 2006, Tomkins agreed a contract extension with the Wigan Warriors which would keep him at the club until 2008. He started from the bench for the next two matches against the Huddersfield Giants and the Salford City Reds, but he was dropped to the Academy just shortly after. He later returned to the squad when he was named on the bench for the Challenge Cup fourth round match, against the Wakefield Trinity Wildcats on 2 April 2006.

He also played in the next couple of Super League matches against the Wakefield Trinity Wildcats and St. Helens, before again being dropped to the Academy. Team Head Coach Ian Millward was sacked in April 2006, because of the poor results from the Wigan Warriors side. He was replaced by Brian Noble on 20 April 2006. The Wigan Warriors were bottom of the Super League and Noble decided to play a more experienced squad, which meant that Tomkins would not make another appearance during 2006.

Tomkins started the 2007 season in the Wigan Warriors' Senior Academy, where he was in good-form scoring 5 tries in one match against Hull Kingston Rovers' Academy. But despite this he was not called up into the first-team squad until 18 May 2007, for the Super League match against Hull Kingston Rovers. Tomkins suffered an ankle injury during the match and was out for 2-weeks, before returning to the Wigan Warriors' Senior Academy. He then later returned to the Wigan Warriors first-team for the match against the Catalans Dragons on 15 June 2007.

Widnes Vikings (loan)
On 27 July 2007, the 20-year-old joined the Widnes Vikings, initially on a month's long loan-deal, with a view to extending the deal to the end of the season.

Widnes Vikings Head Coach Steve McCormack said, "It's a really good signing for the Club. Joel has tremendous ability and experience".

Return to Wigan
He became a regular first-team player for the Wigan Warriors during the 2008 season, he was a substitute in the Wigan Warriors' first match of the season against Harlequins RL. He was not included in the Wigan Warriors squad for the next two games against the Castleford Tigers and Hull Kingston Rovers, but he returned to the squad as a substitute for the match against the Bradford Bulls in which he scored his first try in the 2008 season.

Despite a good performance against the Bradford Bulls, he was not included in the squad for the next two Super League games, his place in the squad was taken by Australian , Phil Bailey. His next appearance was in the Good Friday derby match against St. Helens as a substitute. He kept his place in the squad for 13 consecutive games and he scored two more tries, one against the Warrington Wolves in the Super League round 14 and the other against the Catalans Dragons in round 17.

Tomkins continued to be a presence in the Wigan Warriors' 2009 Super League season. He was successful in the 2010 Super League season, lifting the League Leaders' Shield with the Wigan Warriors.

Tomkins played in the 2010 Super League Grand Final victory over St. Helens at Old Trafford.

He was then part of the Wigan Warriors' side that lost the 2011 World Club Challenge to the St. George Illawarra Dragons.

Tomkins made five consecutive appearances at the start of the 2011 Super League season, including the opening fixture against St. Helens, before being sent-off in a game against Hull F.C.

He received a two-match ban for the incident with his brother Sam, also banned for one-game.

Tomkins returned and scored his first try of the season in round 8, against the Leeds Rhinos.

His next tries came against Hull Kingston Rovers and the Wakefield Trinity Wildcats in rounds 10 and 12.

He scored a try after his brother Sam, sent him away down the wing to score.

Tomkins fended Leeds Rhinos  Danny McGuire off and he side-stepped past Brent Webb and Carl Ablett to score under the post's, after an eighty-metre sprint.

The Wigan Warriors won the game 28–18, giving Tomkins his first Challenge Cup 'Winners' Medal.'

Wigan Warriors (return to rugby league 2014–18)
On 18 June 2014, the Wigan Warriors announced that they had re-signed Tomkins with immediate effect.

He played in the 2014 Super League Grand Final defeat by St. Helens at Old Trafford.

He played in the 2015 Super League Grand Final defeat by the Leeds Rhinos at Old Trafford.

Tomkins was victorious with the Wigan outfit in the 2016 Super League Grand Final. He also claimed victory in the 2017 World Club Challenge, against the Cronulla-Sutherland Sharks by a score of 22–6. Tomkins' final game for the Wigan Warriors came in a 23–0 Challenge Cup quarter-final defeat on 2 June 2018, by the Warrington Wolves.

On 4 June 2018, Tomkins was banned from playing for four-weeks and he was incidentally fined £10,000. After footage posted on Social Media went viral, of him abusing bar staff in a local Wigan public house whilst in the company of his brother Sam. Who was also fined £5,000, for his more limited-role in the incident.

In light of his current situation with the whole incident, Tomkins himself tendered his resignation to Wigan Warriors' Rugby General Manager Kris Radlinski, which was accepted by all parties involved.

Hull Kingston Rovers (2018 – 2019)
Following his resignation from the Wigan Warriors, due to the club said to be, "considering his future" in the wake of his 4-week suspension and £10,000 fine. After footage posted on Social Media went viral, of him abusing bar staff in a local Wigan public house.

It was revealed on 11 June 2018, that Tomkins had signed an 18-month contract to play for Hull Kingston Rovers at Craven Park until the end of the 2019 season.

Hull Kingston Rovers managed to obtain his services despite interest from other rival Super League clubs.

On 17 June 2018, Tomkins made his Hull Kingston Rovers' Super League début in a 24–24 draw, against the Castleford Tigers at the Mend-A-Hose Jungle.

On 29 June 2018, Joel bagged his first try for Hull Kingston Rovers on his home début at Craven Park against the Huddersfield Giants, in a 37–10 Super League victory.

It was revealed on 24 November 2018, that Tomkins had penned a new three-year contract extension to remain at Hull Kingston Rovers until at least the end of the 2021 rugby league season.

It was revealed on 11 January 2019, that Joel was appointed as captain at Hull Kingston Rovers ahead of the start of the 2019 Super League season.

In October 2019, he signed a two-year deal to join Catalans Dragons starting in 2020.

Les Catalans Dragons (2020 - 2021)

During Catalans elimination final victory over Leeds in the 2020 Super League playoffs, Tomkins was placed on report after inappropriate contact with Leeds player Richie Myler.

On 18 November, Tomkins was suspended for eight matches and fined £500 after he was found guilty of inappropriate contact.

On 9 October 2021, Tomkins played for Catalans in their 2021 Super League Grand Final defeat against St. Helens.

Representative rugby league career
He is a former England International representative .

Tomkins was selected to play for England against France in a one-off test in 2010.

Amongst featuring for England on several more occasions during the 2010–2014 rugby league seasons.

Retirement 
On 18 November 2021, Tomkins announced his retirement from professional rugby

Rugby union career

Saracens
At the end of the 2011 Super League season, Tomkins switched rugby codes after agreeing a £400,000 contract, (£120,000 a year) at the Saracens, after a £250,000 release-fee was agreed with the Wigan Warriors.

From 2011–2014, he played rugby union at outside centre for the Saracens.

Representative rugby union career

England Saxons
In 2013, Tomkins was called up for the first of his two caps for the second-string England Saxons rugby union team.

Starting at outside centre in both tests, Tomkins enjoyed initial success against the Ireland Wolfhounds in a closely contested match, ending in a 14–10 victory for the England Saxons.

However a week later, Tomkins experienced his first taste of defeat in a union white shirt by a strong Scotland A team, who ran-out winners 9–13, in a rain-swept match set in Newcastle.

England
He won his début England cap in a 20–13 victory over Australia, in the 2013 Autumn International Series.

Following Tomkins' good-form for the Saracens in the 2013–2014 season and the vacancy of the number 13 jersey, left by the injured incumbent Manu Tuilagi. Tomkins was selected at outside centre for England's 1st XV to face Australia, on 2 November 2013 QBE International Test.

A match England's 1st XV won 20–13, to regain the Cook Cup. With Tomkins débuting in a new centre partnership with Gloucester centre, Billy Twelvetrees.

Career statistics

Rugby league

Honours

Club
Super League (2): 2010, 2016
World Club Challenge (1): 2017
League Leaders' Shield (1): 2010
Challenge Cup (1): 2011

References

External links

Hull Kingston Rovers profile
Profile at wiganwarriors.com
SL profile
Statistics at wigan.rlfans.com

1987 births
Living people
Catalans Dragons players
Dual-code rugby internationals
England international rugby union players
England national rugby league team players
English rugby league players
Hull Kingston Rovers players
Rugby league centres
Rugby league players from Warrington
Rugby league second-rows
Rugby union centres
Rugby union players from Warrington
Saracens F.C. players
Widnes Vikings players
Wigan Warriors players